Kempten (()) is the largest town of Allgäu, in Swabia, Bavaria, Germany. The population was about 68,000 in 2016. The area was possibly settled originally by Celts, but was later taken over by the Romans, who called the town Cambodunum. Kempten is the oldest urban settlement (town) in Germany.

History

Pre-Roman
The Greek geographer Strabo mentions in 50 BC a town of the Celtic Estiones named Kambodunon. This is considered the oldest written reference of any German city. So far no archaeological evidence could be found that this Celtic settlement really existed.

Roman era
In 15 BC Roman troops led by Nero Claudius Drusus and his brother Tiberius conquered and destroyed an existing Celtic settlement.  Later the settlement was named Cambodunum.
In the following years the city was rebuilt on a classical Roman city plan with baths, forum and temples. Initially in wood, the city was later rebuilt in stone after a devastating fire that destroyed almost the entire city in the year 69 AD. The city possibly served as provincial capital of Raetia during the first century before Augsburg took over this role. Extensive archaeological excavations at the end of the 19th century and again during the 1950s at what were then the outskirts of Kempten unearthed the extensive structural foundations.

The city was again destroyed in 233 AD by the Alemanni, a Suebic tribe. The original site of Cambodunum was then abandoned and the settlement moved to a strategically safer location on the Burghalde hill overlooking the river Iller.

In the middle of the 5th century the last Roman troops had left the area and the city was entirely taken over by the Alemanni.

Middle Ages 
After the Romans abandoned the settlement, it was moved from the hill down to the plains located next to the river Iller. In written sources, the town appears as Cambidano. Being still predominantly Alemannic, the town once more was destroyed by the Franks in 683 as a consequence of the city's support of an uprising against the Frankish kingdom.

Around 700 a monastery — Kempten Abbey — was built, the first in the Allgäu region, founded by two Benedictine monks from the Abbey of Saint Gall, Magnus von Füssen and Theodor. Audogar was the first abbot of the new Benedictine monastery. Through the financial and lobbyist support of Charlemagne’s wife Hildegard, an Allemannic princess, the monastery managed to become one of the most privileged of the Frankish Empire.

After several ravages by the Magyars, Ulrich of Augsburg, bishop of Augsburg and also abbot of Kempten, began the rebuilding of the monastery and the city in 941.

In 1213, Holy Roman Emperor Frederick II declared the abbots members of the Reichstag and granted the abbot the right to bear the title of Duke. However in 1289, King Rudolf I of Germany also granted special privileges to the urban settlement in the river valley, making it the Free Imperial City of Kempten. In 1525 the last property rights of the abbots in the Imperial City were sold in the so-called "Great Purchase", marking the start of the co-existence of two independent cities bearing the same name next to each other. More conflict arose after the Imperial City converted to Protestantism in direct opposition to the Catholic monastery (and Free City) in 1527.

Renaissance and Baroque to Modern Age 
During the turmoil of the Thirty Years' War (1632–33), both cities were destroyed by the imperial forces and the Swedish troops respectively.

In 1652 Roman Giel of Gielsberg, the Abbot of Kempten, commissioned the architects Michael Beer and Johann Serro from Graubünden to build St. Lorenz Basilica as a new church to serve the parish and monastery, including a representative residence for the Duke-Abbots. This is acknowledged as the first large church built in Germany after the end of the Thirty Years' War.

During the Napoleonic Wars the Duke-Abbey and Imperial City came under Bavarian rule (1802–03). Finally, in 1819, the two rival cities were united into a single communal entity.

The city was the location of two subcamps of the Dachau concentration camp during World War II, each with about 700 inmates.

Claude (Claudius) Honoré Desiré Dornier born in Kempten im Allgäu (May 14, 1884 - December 5, 1969) was a German aircraft engineer and founder of Dornier GmbH. His legacy remains in the few aircraft named after him, including the Dornier Do 18 and the 12-engine Dornier Do X flying boat, for decades the world's largest and most powerful airplane.

Climate

Main sights

 The St. Lorenz Basilica (Basilica minor)
 The St. Mang Church
 The Burghalde, a ruin
 The Duke-Abbots' Residence
 The Archaeological Park Cambodunum
 The City Hall and Square
 The Erasmuskapelle (an underground chapel)

Transport
Kempten is well connected with the region through the A 7 autobahn (Würzburg–Ulm–Füssen). Bundesstraßen B 12 (partly as A 980 autobahn), B 19 and B 309 also intersect in Kempten.

The city is on the Buchloe–Lindau railway, opened as part of the Ludwig South-North Railway in 1852, and  Kempten station currently boasts good InterCity and EuroCity rail connections.

The city bus system is operated by Kemptener Verkehrsbetriebe, which operates over 20 lines.

Education
The Kempten University of Applied Sciences started in the winter semester of 1978–79 with 89 students and since then expanded and now accommodates more than 2800 students in eight degree courses:
 Business Administration
 Computer Science
 Electrical Engineering
 Industrial Engineering – Electronic and Information Technology
 Industrial Engineering – Mechanical Engineering with Distribution Management or Information Technology
 Mechanical Engineering
 Social Management
 Tourism and Hospitality Management

There are also three college preparatory schools, called Gymnasium, (Allgäu-Gymnasium, Hildegardis-Gymnasium, Carl-von-Linde-Gymnasium) offering secondary education to the entire region of the Allgäu.

Notable people

Carl von Linde (1842–1934), scientist and inventor in cooling technology
Claude Dornier (1884–1969), aircraft designer
Ernst Mayr (1904–2005), German-American biologist
Søren Kam (1921–2015), Danish SS-Obersturmführer, war criminal
Ignaz Kiechle (1930–2003), politician (CSU), member of Bundestag 1969–1994, Minister for Food, Agriculture and Forestry 1983–1993
Heide Schmidt (born 1948), Austrian politician
Günther Dollinger (born 1960), physicist and professor
Dieter Lohr (born 1965), writer and audiobook publishers
İlhan Mansız (born 1975), Turkish footballer
Peter Terting (born 1984), racing driver
Lisa Brennauer (born 1988), world champion cyclist
Daniel Abt (born 1992), racing driver
Friedrich Ferdinand Schnitzer, prominent United States architect who built a number of structures on the National Register of Historic Places

Twin towns – sister cities

Kempten is twinned with:
 Bad Dürkheim, Germany (2001)
 Quiberon, France (1971)
 Sligo, Ireland (1990)
 Sopron, Hungary (1987)
 Trento, Italy (1987)

References

External links

Official website

 
Carolingian architecture
Free imperial cities